= Operation Frankish =

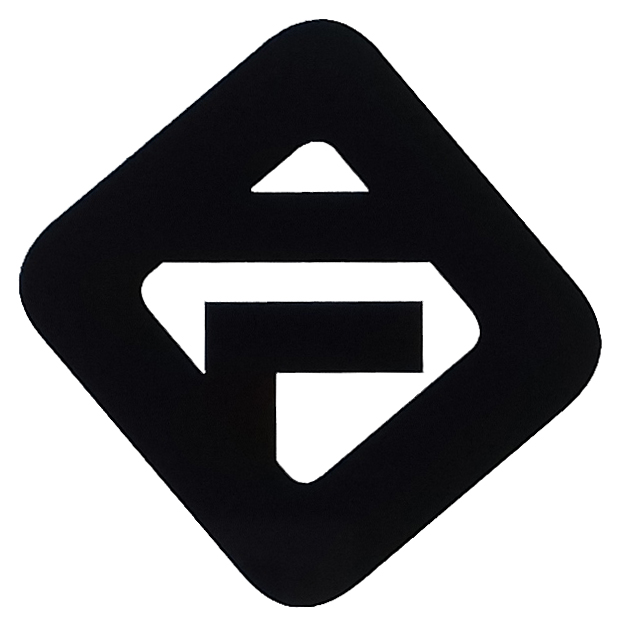
Operation Frankish

Operation Frankish: Cage The Monsters, founded in May 2016, is a small but growing operation based in the U.K. They are a pro-active animal welfare & rights pressure group, working within the law, seeking imprisonment for convicted animal abusers in the U.K. They have four principle aims which are to:

1. Ensure sentences are increased from their present 26 weeks to 5 years.
2. Ensure that judges and magistrates are instructed to use their future custodial powers.
3. End the practice of electronic tagging and home curfews. The cost is massive and the fail rate high.
4. Endorse the idea of a national register for pet abusers, which would be accessible to the public.

Rather than using conventional methods such as using an online petition, Operation Frankish brings attention to the plight of animal abuse, and the laws pertaining to it, through awareness stunts which include flying banner planes over football matches and Twitterstorms featuring eye-catching images and simple, to-the-point messages relating to animal abuse.
